Mill Canyon is a valley in the U.S. state of Nevada.

Mill Canyon was named for a mill which operated in the valley in the 1860s.

References

Valleys of Eureka County, Nevada